Fritz Pott (23 April 1939 – 11 January 2015) was a German football player and coach. As a player, he spent seven seasons in the Bundesliga with 1. FC Köln. He represented Germany in three friendlies.

He died on 11 January 2015.

Honours
 Bundesliga champion: 1963–64
 DFB-Pokal winner: 1967–68
 DFB-Pokal finalist: 1969–70

References

External links
 

1939 births
2015 deaths
German footballers
Germany international footballers
Bundesliga players
1. FC Köln players
German football managers
FC Viktoria Köln managers
Association football defenders
Footballers from Cologne